Cosmoclostis leucomochla is a moth of the family Pterophoridae. It was described by Thomas Bainbrigge Fletcher from Sri Lanka. It was later also discovered in Myanmar and on Leyte in the Philippines.

The larvae feed on Gmelina arborea.

References

Pterophorini
Moths of Asia
Moths described in 1947